Alonzo W. Pond (1894–25 December 1986) was an American archaeologist.

Born in Janesville, Wisconsin, he was assistant curator of the Logan Museum of Anthropology in Beloit, Wisconsin in 1924. Between 1925 and 1930 he conducted excavations of prehistoric sites in northeastern Algeria. After 1931 he served as "an archaeologist and project supervisor for the National Park Service, the Civilian Conservation Corps, and Cave of the Mounds at Blue Mounds, Wisconsin." Between 1934 and 1936, along with John T. Zaharov, H. Summerfield Day, and W.J. Winter, Pond directed the Civilian Conservation Corps excavations of colonial Jamestown.

He delivered lectures illustrated with lantern slides on such topics as "With Andrews in the Gobi", "Nomads of Algeria", "Lost John of Mummy Ledge", and Mammoth Cave. He wrote a pictorial guide on natural and man-made landscape features entitled Wisconsin Nooks and Corners, with all photographs taken by himself. Pond was a member of the Explorers Club and the Adventurer's Club of Chicago.

References

1894 births
1986 deaths
People from Beloit, Wisconsin
People from Janesville, Wisconsin
20th-century American archaeologists
Historians from Wisconsin